"Still Holding Out For You" is a song recorded by American country music group SHeDAISY.  It was released in April 2001 as the fifth and final single from the trio's debut album The Whole SHeBANG.  The song reached #27 on the Billboard Hot Country Singles & Tracks chart.  The song was written by Kristyn Osborn and Richard Marx. It is best known for appearing on a trailer for Disney's 2001 direct to video film Lady and the Tramp II: Scamp's Adventure.

Chart performance

References

2001 singles
1999 songs
SHeDAISY songs
Songs written by Richard Marx
Songs written by Kristyn Osborn
Song recordings produced by Dann Huff
Lyric Street Records singles